Naata Nungurrayi (born 1932) is an Australian Aboriginal artist.

Life
She is from the Pintupi group from Kintore, Northern Territory and is one of the senior elders of the Kintore women artist movement.

Naata is the sister of George Tjungurrayi and Nancy Nungurrayi, and her son is Kenny Williams Tjampitjinpa who are all well-known artists.

One of her paintings appeared on Australia Post stamps in a 2003 special edition of Aboriginal art.

Naata Nungurrayi was named among the Top 50 of Australia’s Most Collectable Artists

References

1932 births
Living people
Australian Aboriginal artists
Indigenous Australians from Western Australia
Artists from the Northern Territory
Pintupi
People from Goldfields-Esperance
20th-century Australian women artists
20th-century Australian painters
21st-century Australian women artists
21st-century Australian painters